The Georgian was a long distance passenger train operated by the Louisville and Nashville Railroad in conjunction with the Chicago and Eastern Illinois Railroad. It was operated between St. Louis Union Station and Atlanta's Union Station with a section operated by the C&EI from Evansville to Chicago's Dearborn Station. From Nashville to Atlanta it operated over the tracks of the Nashville, Chattanooga and St. Louis Railway. With the introduction of this train, this made the C&EI's Chicago-Evansville Whippoorwill train superfluous.

It was begun in 1946 as a streamliner. As a night train, it offered sleeping car and dining car services. In 1968 the L&N Railroad discontinued the Georgian. In its place was an unnamed St. Louis-Evansville train, and an unnamed Evansville-Atlanta train. (The Chicago branch from Evansville eliminated, passengers seeking an L&N route would need to wait several hours at Nashville for a connection to the South Wind.)  The St. Louis-Evansville and the Evansville-Atlanta trains were among the trains that Amtrak chose not to pick up when it assumed long-distance operations on May 1, 1971.  Since that time Atlanta has had no service heading directly north to Tennessee.

Important station stops
Chicago
Danville
Terre Haute
Vincennes
Evansville
Nashville
Chattanooga
Dalton
Marietta
Atlanta

Important stops on St. Louis section
St. Louis
Evansville

External links
The Georgian at American-rails.com
The Georgian schedule at Streamliner Schedules
1965 L&N schedule

Notes

Passenger trains of the Louisville and Nashville Railroad
Passenger trains of the Chicago and Eastern Illinois Railroad
Named passenger trains of the United States
North American streamliner trains
Night trains of the United States
Passenger rail transportation in Georgia (U.S. state)
Passenger rail transportation in Illinois
Passenger rail transportation in Indiana
Passenger rail transportation in Missouri
Passenger rail transportation in Tennessee
Railway services introduced in 1946
Railway services discontinued in 1968
1946 establishments in the United States
1968 disestablishments in the United States